Ken Walshaw (28 August 1918 – 1979) was an English professional footballer who played as an inside forward.

Career
Born in Tynemouth, Walshaw played for North Shields, Sunderland, Lincoln City, Carlisle United and Bradford City.

References

1918 births
1979 deaths
English footballers
North Shields F.C. players
Sunderland A.F.C. players
Lincoln City F.C. players
Carlisle United F.C. players
Bradford City A.F.C. players
English Football League players
Association football inside forwards

Sportspeople from Tynemouth
Footballers from Tyne and Wear